Billie Catherine Lourd (born July 17, 1992) is an American actress. She is known for starring as Chanel #3 in the Fox horror comedy series Scream Queens (2015–2016) and for her roles in the FX horror anthology series American Horror Story (2017–present). She also appears as Lieutenant Connix in the Star Wars sequel trilogy (2015–2019). Lourd is the only child of actress Carrie Fisher.

Early life 
Billie Catherine Lourd was born July 17, 1992, in Los Angeles, California, the only child of actress Carrie Fisher and talent agent Bryan Lourd. Lourd is also the only grandchild of actress Debbie Reynolds and singer Eddie Fisher, and the niece of Todd Fisher, Joely Fisher, and Tricia Leigh Fisher, all of whom have worked in show business. She has a sister, Ava, from her father's marriage to Bruce Bozzi, whom her father legally adopted. From her mother's side, she is of Russian-Jewish and Scots-Irish/English descent. Her godmother is actress Meryl Streep. Writer Bruce Wagner is Lourd's godfather. Eddie Fisher stated in his autobiography (Been There Done That) that his granddaughter's name is Catherine Fisher Lourd and her nickname is "Billy".

In 2008 Lourd was a debutante at Le Bal des débutantes at the Hôtel de Crillon in Paris. She was dressed by Chanel for the occasion.

Lourd attended high school at Harvard-Westlake School in Los Angeles. She graduated with a self-designed degree in "Art and Business as Religion" from New York University Gallatin School of Individualized Study, in 2014.

Career

2015–2019: Early roles
Lourd played the role of Lieutenant Connix in the 2015 Star Wars sequel film The Force Awakens. On The Ellen DeGeneres Show in 2017, she said that she auditioned for the lead role of Rey, which ultimately went to Daisy Ridley. Lourd also appeared in the second installment, Star Wars: The Last Jedi (2017), and the third, Star Wars: The Rise of Skywalker (2019). Lourd also played her mother's character  for a brief flashback in the film in which her face was digitally replaced by Fisher's likeness, using imagery from Return of the Jedi.

In February 2015, Lourd was cast in the Fox horror-comedy series Scream Queens. Lourd's character, a rich and disaffected sorority girl known as Chanel #3, wears earmuffs as an homage to Fisher's iconic "cinnamon buns" hairstyle from the original Star Wars film. In December 2015, Lourd spoke about her initial meeting with Scream Queens creator Ryan Murphy:

In December 2015, Lourd had joined the cast of the American biographical crime-drama film Billionaire Boys Club, in the role of Rosanna, love interest of Kyle Biltmore. The film was released on July 17, 2018. Its release was put off due to claims of sexual harassment committed by actor Kevin Spacey, who stars in the film. In 2016, Lourd returned to Scream Queens for its second season. She joined the cast of American Horror Story in the role of Winter Anderson for the series' seventh season. She also portrayed Linda Kasabian, a former member of the Manson Family cult. She returned to American Horror Story for its eighth season, Apocalypse, playing Mallory, a powerful witch.

2019–present: Continued success
In 2019, Lourd played Gigi in Booksmart, a high school comedy film directed by Olivia Wilde. Lourd also returned to American Horror Story for its ninth season, 1984, portraying an aerobics enthusiast  punk rocker Montana Duke. Murphy stated that her work in 1984 impressed him so much that he decided to write Lourd her own miniseries. She appeared in the ninth episode of the eleventh and final season of the NBC sitcom Will & Grace as Fiona, the granddaughter of the character that her real-life grandmother, Debbie Reynolds, portrayed during the show's original run. In December 2019, Lourd appeared in a holiday-themed television commercial for Old Navy.

In 2021, Lourd returned to American Horror Story for the tenth season of the series as Lark Feldman, a mysterious tattoo artist and dentist. The following year, she starred in the romantic comedy Ticket to Paradise alongside Julia Roberts and George Clooney. She also returned to American Horror Story for its eleventh season as Hannah Wells, a biologist studying a viral strain in New York City. She is next set to star as Audrey in the transatlantic comedy And Mrs directed by Daniel Reisinger, which wrapped filming in October 2022.

Personal life 
Lourd began dating actor Austen Rydell in early 2016. During a brief split from Rydell, she dated actor and Scream Queens co-star Taylor Lautner between December 2016 to July 2017. Later in 2017, Lourd and Rydell reconciled. They became engaged in June 2020, and their son was born in September 2020. They were married in March 2022. In December 2022, Lourd had her second child, a daughter.

Through her marriage to Rydell, Lourd is the daughter-in-law of actor Christopher Rydell, and the granddaughter-in-law of director Mark Rydell and actress Joanne Linville.

Filmography

Film

Television

Producer 
 Wildflower   (2022)

References

External links 

 

1992 births
21st-century American actresses
Actresses from Los Angeles
American debutantes
American people of English descent
American people of Russian-Jewish descent
American people of Scotch-Irish descent
American television actresses
American film actresses
Debutantes of le Bal des débutantes
Harvard-Westlake School alumni
Living people
New York University alumni